The 1961–62 FAW Welsh Cup is the 75th season of the annual knockout tournament for competitive football teams in Wales.

Key
League name pointed after clubs name.
CCL - Cheshire County League
FL D2 - Football League Second Division
FL D3 - Football League Third Division
FL D4 - Football League Fourth Division
WLN - Welsh League North

Fifth round
Ten winners from the Fourth round and six new clubs.

Sixth round

Semifinal
Bangor City and Cardiff City played at Wrexham, Wrexham and Swansea Town played at Cardiff.

Final
Third match was played at Rhyl.

External links
The FAW Welsh Cup

1961-62
Wales
Cup